Eoconus sulciferus is an extinct species of sea snail, a marine gastropod mollusk, in the family Conidae.

Description
The length of the shell attains 63 mm

Distribution
Fossils of this species were found in Eocene strata in the Paris Basin, France

References

 Deshayes, G. P. "GP 1835-1845." Histoire naturelle des animaux sans vertèbres 1 (1835): 11.

External links
 Worldwide Mollusc Species Data Base: Conus sulciferus

sulciferus
Gastropods described in 1835